Rob (1939 – 18 January 1952) was a Collie dog who in February 1945 was awarded the Dickin Medal, considered to be the animals' Victoria Cross. He was alleged to have made over 20 parachute descents during the North African Campaign, serving with the SAS. However, in 2006, his actions were revealed as being a possible hoax perpetrated by members of his regiment in order to prevent Rob leaving after his original owners requested his return.

Early life and military service
Rob was a working dog on a farm in Shropshire until 1942, when his owners, Basil and Heather Bayne, enlisted him as a war dog. Assigned to the Special Air Service at the base in Wivenhoe Park, Essex, Rob's official designation was war dog No 471/322. He was used as a messenger and a guard dog.

Dickin Medal
Rob received his medal in London on 3 February 1945.  The citation read "For service including 20 parachute jumps while serving with Infantry in North Africa and SAS Regiment in Italy." Rob won other medals for bravery, including an RSPCA silver medal.  The Dickin Medal is often referred to as the animal metaphorical equivalent of the Victoria Cross.

Hoax
According to Quentin Hughes' autobiographical account of his time in the 2nd SAS, Who Cares Who Wins?, the actions which led to Rob's Dickin Medal were in fact a hoax. He reported that instead of completing parachute drops as reported, the dog acted as a companion to the regiment quartermaster, Tom Burt.
Lll
Hughes wrote that when hearing that the family which donated Rob to the Army Veterinary and Remount Services had requested the dog back, he and Burt worked together to keep Rob by exaggerating his exploits. At one point they attempted to carry out a parachute jump with Rob but weather conditions were unfavourable and they could not follow through with the jump as Hughes wrote, "We had a suitable parachute harness and I phoned through to the RAF and made arrangements for Rob to have a short flight, unfortunately, quite a strong wind blew up during the flight and the RAF decided it would be dangerous to drop Rob on that day." They had planned to send a letter to his owners following the successful drop, and after the failure decided to send it anyway. Rob's owners passed the letter about the dog's actions to the PDSA, resulting in Rob's Dickin Medal in January 1945. Although Hughes died in 2004, the possibility of a hoax wasn't revealed until 2006 when a painting of Rob was featured in an exhibition entitled "The Animals War" at the Imperial War Museum in London. According to Hughes' friend Mickey King, who remembered the author discussing the incident, "Quentin said that nobody survived 20 parachute drops, let alone a dog. You were lucky to survive three."

Sold at Auction
Rob's Dickin Medal was sold by auction at Noonans Mayfair in London for a record price of £140,000 (plus 24% buyer's premium) on 12 October 2022.

Later life
Following his military service, he returned to his owners in Tetchill, Shropshire. He died in 1952 and was buried on the family farm, marked with a stone memorial which reads:

In literature
A children's book has been written about Rob, entitled Rob the Paradog, written by Dorothy Nicholle and published by Blue Hills Press.

See also
List of individual dogs

Notes

External links
 PDSA Dickin Medal, including "Roll of Honor" PDF

1952 animal deaths
1939 animal births
Hoaxes in the United Kingdom
British Army animals
Special Air Service
1940s hoaxes
Individual dogs awarded the Dickin Medal
British Army personnel of World War II
Military animals of World War II